The Fort Frances–International Falls International Bridge is a privately owned international toll bridge connecting the towns of Fort Frances, Ontario, and International Falls, Minnesota, across the Rainy River.

The road and rail bridge was built in 1912 by the local paper company, and is still jointly owned by Boise Inc. and Resolute Forest Products, formerly Abitibi-Consolidated, which operated paper mills on the US and Canadian sides of the river, respectively, until the Fort Frances mill closed in 2014. A couplet for northbound vehicles was built in 1980.

The bridge toll is charged in US dollars on northbound traffic; only cash is accepted. The toll rates are $7 for cars and pickup trucks, $2 for motorcycles, $8 for campers, $16 for semi trucks and buses, $350 for trucks with oversized loads, and $4 for trailers. Discounted multi-trip swipe cards are available at the area grocery stores.  There is no toll collected on southbound trips or for pedestrian traffic.

The bridge carries both road traffic and rail traffic of the Minnesota, Dakota and Western Railway without grade separation. The rails run along the west side of the bridge, which also carries a pipeline between the paper mills. The east side of the bridge carries two lanes of automobile traffic, one in each direction. Trucks and buses are directed to drive on the rail portion of the bridge, which is capable of handling heavier loads.

A dam constructed in 1905 lies immediately west of the bridge. The reservoir to the east of the dam conceals the rapids for which International Falls was named.

The bridge is the northern terminus of US Highway 71 (US 71) and US 53. It connects with Highway 11 and Highway 71, part of the Trans-Canada Highway, on the Ontario side.

International crossing

Customs checkpoints are located on both ends of the bridge for road traffic:

 United States Customs and Border Protection - 2 Second Ave, International Falls;
 Canada Border Services Agency - 101 Church Street, Fort Frances.

References

Railway bridges in Ontario
Railroad bridges in Minnesota
Road-rail bridges in the United States
Canada–United States bridges
Transport in Fort Frances
Road bridges in Ontario
Buildings and structures in Koochiching County, Minnesota
Transportation in Koochiching County, Minnesota
U.S. Route 53
U.S. Route 71
Bridges of the United States Numbered Highway System
Road bridges in Minnesota
Toll bridges in Minnesota
Toll bridges in Canada
Buildings and structures in Rainy River District
International Falls, Minnesota
Plate girder bridges in the United States
Concrete bridges in the United States
Concrete bridges in Canada
Parker truss bridges in the United States
Parker truss bridges in Canada
Plate girder bridges
Bridges completed in 1912
1912 establishments in Minnesota
1912 establishments in Ontario